The Canton of Belleville-en-Beaujolais (before March 2020: canton of Belleville) is a French administrative division, located in the Rhône department.

The canton was modified by decree of 27 February 2014 which came into force in March 2015.


Composition
The canton of Belleville is composed of 27 communes:

See also
 Cantons of the Rhône department
 Communes of the Rhône department

References

Cantons of Rhône (department)
Responses to the COVID-19 pandemic